Finswimming has featured as a trend sport at the World Games since the inaugural 1981 World Games held in Santa Clara, California.

Organization of World Games competition
Participation is reserved for the best swimmers and the best relay teams.  Confédération Mondiale des Activités Subaquatiques (CMAS), the international federation responsible for finswimming, selects participants on the basis of the CMAS World Ranking which is a listing of the best performing senior and junior men and women from the most recent Finswimming World Championships and the rounds of the annual World Cup.  The eight best qualifying swimmers in the CMAS World Ranking are obligated to compete while other swimmers will be invited to participate.
The final selection of swimmers is the responsibility of the CMAS Finswimming Commission with agreement from the CMAS Board of Directors.  Each invited national federation may field no more than two swimmers per race and one relay team.  A place in the relay is available for the World Games host if it chooses to field a team.

As of November 2013, the program consists of qualifying and final races held over two days for the following techniques and distances for senior men and women:
Apnoea swimming (AP) - 50m,
Surface swimming (SF) - 100m, 200m, 400m and the 4 × 100 m relay.

Medalists

Men

50m surface

100m surface

200m surface

400m surface

800m surface

1500m surface

4x100m relay

4x200m relay

50m apnoea

100m immersion

400m immersion

50m bi-fins

100m bi-fins

Women

50m surface

100m surface

200m surface

400m surface

800m surface

4x100m relay

4x200m relay

50m apnoea

100m immersion

400m immersion

50m bi-fins

100m bi-fins

Medal table

References

External links
 World Games at Sports123 by Internet Archive
  CMAS Finswimming Championships Archive

 
Sports at the World Games
World Games